Ostholstein is a district in Schleswig-Holstein, Germany. It is bounded by (from the southwest and clockwise) the districts of Stormarn, Segeberg and Plön, the Baltic Sea and the city of Lübeck.

History

The district was established in 1970 by merging the former districts of Eutin and Oldenburg in Holstein. These former districts have different histories.

The District of Eutin emerged from the Principality, and later Region of Lübeck, which again emerged from the secularised prince-bishopric of Lübeck. In 1803 it became an exclave of the Duchy of Oldenburg (which confusingly has nothing to do with the Holsteinian city of Oldenburg). In 1937 it was transferred to Prussia as the district of Eutin within the Prussian province of Schleswig-Holstein.

The region of Oldenburg was a part of the Duchy of Holstein. In 1864 Holstein became subordinate to Prussia, which soon afterwards established the district of Oldenburg in Holstein.

Geography

The district consists of the Wagrien peninsula between the Bay of Lübeck and the Bay of Kiel, the island of Fehmarn, the eastern part of the region called "Holsteinische Schweiz" (Holsatian Switzerland) and the northern suburbs of Lübeck.

Holsatian Switzerland is an area full of lakes and woody hills, which is shared with the adjoining district of Plön. The Bungsberg, though only 168 m in height, is the highest elevation in Schleswig-Holstein. The island of Fehmarn is the third largest island of Germany. Since 1963 it has been connected to the mainland by a suspension bridge.

Coat of arms
The coat of arms displays:
 a cross from the arms of the bishopric of Lübeck; this bishopric existed until 1535 and owned large possessions in the region
 a tower from the city arms of Oldenburg

Towns and municipalities

References

External links

Official website (German)
Information about the culture and landscape of Ostholstein (German)

 
Districts of Schleswig-Holstein